Aung Kyaw Tun is a Burmese former professional footballer who played as a midfielder.

International career
Tun became the youngest ever player to feature in a FIFA recognised match, when, at 14 years and 93 days, he made his debut for Myanmar against Thailand in the 2000 Tiger Cup, a record he held for over 10 years before it was broken in November 2011 by Somali player Abdinur Mohamud. He also scored in the match against Thailand, making him the youngest ever international male goalscorer - a record which still stands. Since then, he has accumulated 13 international caps.

Coaching career
Tun now works as the assistant manager for the Myanmar national under-20 football team.

Career statistics

International

International goals
Scores and results list Myanmar's goal tally first.

References

1986 births
Living people
Myanmar international footballers
Burmese footballers
Association football midfielders